George Finlay (1799–1875) was a British historian.

George Finlay or Findlay may also refer to:
 George Finlay (Texas politician) in Eighteenth Texas Legislature
 George Findlay (railway manager) (1829–1893), British railwayman
 George Findlay (1889–1967), Scottish recipient of the Victoria Cross
 George Finlay (priest), Irish Anglican priest